"Divided We Stand" is a fan-produced Star Trek episode released in 2015, the fifth in the web series Star Trek Continues, which aims to continue the episodes of Star Trek: The Original Series replicating their visual and storytelling style The episode is dedicated to Grace Lee Whitney, who had died earlier in the year.

Plot synopsis
During an attempt to free the ship's computer from a nano-virus, an explosion puts Kirk and McCoy in a coma that leaves them awake in a turbulent moment in time - the American Civil War, with Kirk in a Union uniform and McCoy in a Confederate uniform - the Battle of Antietam.

Notes and references

External links
"Divided We Stand" at the Star Trek Continues website

Fan films based on Star Trek
American short films
2015 short films
2015 American television episodes
2015 television films